Nocturnal Playground is the first album by American guitarist Russ Freeman, released on April 10, 1986 by Brainchild Records. After this album, Freeman formed the band the Rippingtons. Several tracks from the album appeared on The Weather Channel in its infancy, and were later used on News at 11 by Cat System Corp.

Track listing

Personnel
 Russ Freeman – guitars, guitar synthesizer, synth bass, keyboards, drum programming
 Brandon Fields – alto saxophone
 David Vasquez – keyboards
 Mike Watts – piano on "Amelia"
 David Renick – drums, percussion
 Steve Reid – percussion and programming

External links
 Nocturnal Playground at AllMusic
 Nocturnal Playground at Discogs
 Rippingtons official website

1986 albums